Gold train or Gold Train may refer to:

Train carrying valuables
 Hungarian Gold Train
 Kolchak's gold train, a train with Russian Imperial gold supply last held by Admiral Kolchak
 Nazi gold train, a rumored armored train full of treasures that left Breslau (now Wrocław) in late 1944 and was lost

Art, entertainment, and media

Film
 30 Winchester per El Diablo (1965), an Italian Spaghetti Western film

Literature
 The Gold Train: The Destruction of the Jews and the Looting of Hungary (2015), a non-fiction book by Ronald W. Zweig

See also
Gold laundering
 Money train
Nazi gold